Holder is an unincorporated community in Citrus County, Florida, United States.  Holder is located around the intersection of U.S. Route 41 and County Road 491 (North Lecanto Highway). West of this intersection is a crossing for the Withlacoochee State Trail.  The ZIP Code for Holder is 34445.

See also

References

External links

Unincorporated communities in Citrus County, Florida
Unincorporated communities in Florida